Bugs and Daffy's Carnival of the Animals (originally aired on TV as Carnival of the Animals) is a 1976 live action/animated television special featuring the Looney Tunes characters Bugs Bunny and Daffy Duck and directed by Chuck Jones.

The special, based on Camille Saint-Saëns' musical suite of the same name and consisting of entirely new animation, was purposely cast in the successful mold of Jones' own earlier musical cartoons (including Rabbit of Seville, Long-Haired Hare and Baton Bunny), and set the familiar showbiz rivalry between Bugs and Daffy against the orchestral backdrop of conductor Michael Tilson Thomas, in a performance based on Saint-Saëns' music and Ogden Nash's poetry.

Carnival of the Animals originally aired on CBS on November 22, 1976, and was the first Warner Bros.-commissioned work featuring Bugs Bunny following the release of the cartoon False Hare, as well as their first Looney Tunes production following the second closure of their original animation studio on October 10, 1969.

This is an abridged version of the work, omitting the "Tortoise", "Characters with Long Ears", "Cuckoo" and "Swan" movements and using the "Pianists" music over the ending credits.

Production

Behind the scenes 
Prime-time television would seem to be the natural place for the adult humor of Warner's classic cartoons, as was exemplified by the success of The Bugs Bunny Show that aired Tuesday evenings on ABC in the early 1960s. However, in the mid-1960s, the Warner Bros. cartoons had become established as kiddie entertainment. By 1968, executives at CBS were convinced that all animated material, no matter what its original intended audience had been, belonged exclusively on Saturday mornings. However, the popular characters of Looney Tunes and Merrie Melodies intentionally had enduring adult appeal from the first, and with the success of other prime-time television specials such as the various Peanuts specials that were being produced at the time, network programmers were finally convinced to give the Warner Bros. animated characters another chance in prime time.
 
According to animation historians Kevin McCorry and Jon Cooke:

Cartoon characters, appearing in holiday-related, half-hour features, could be relied upon to garner respectable ratings and advertising revenue. Further, with the reduction of regular series episodes per season to below 26, specials were needed to fill the gaps in the 52 weeks that constituted a television season.

This special marked the first time since Warner Bros. had closed their studios in 1964 that Bugs Bunny had appeared on-screen with new material. (Bugs, unlike most of the other regular Looney Tunes characters, had not appeared in any of the outsourced productions distributed under the Warner Bros. banner from 1964 to 1969.)

Credits

Cast 
 Mel Blanc as Bugs Bunny, Daffy Duck, and Porky Pig (voice characterizations)
 Michael Tilson Thomas as Himself (the conductor)

Crew 
 Cinematography by Wally Bulloch
 Production Design by Herbert Klynn
 Animation by:
 Phil Monroe
 Manny Perez
 Tom Ray
 Lloyd Vaughan
 Ben Washam
 Produced, written, and directed by Chuck Jones

Availability 
Bugs and Daffy's Carnival of the Animals is available on VHS, and was later released on the Looney Tunes Golden Collection: Volume 5 DVD along with Bugs Bunny's Bustin' Out All Over and Bugs Bunny's Looney Christmas Tales.

See also 
 The Carnival of the Animals
 List of Bugs Bunny cartoons
 List of Daffy Duck cartoons

References

External links 
 

1970s animated television specials
1976 in American television
1976 television specials
1970s American television specials
1970s American animated films
Animated television specials
CBS original programming
CBS television specials
Bugs Bunny films
Daffy Duck films
Porky Pig films
Looney Tunes television specials
Short films with live action and animation
Television shows directed by Chuck Jones
Thanksgiving television specials